Sylvia White (born March 29, 1943) is an American speed skater. She competed in the women's 3000 metres at the 1964 Winter Olympics.

References

External links
 

1943 births
Living people
American female speed skaters
Olympic speed skaters of the United States
Speed skaters at the 1964 Winter Olympics
Sportspeople from Seattle
21st-century American women